Kawakubo (written: 川久保) is a Japanese surname. Notable people with the surname include:

, Japanese voice actor
, Japanese fashion designer
, Japanese actor
, American classical violinist

Japanese-language surnames